The Far North Line is a rural railway line entirely within the Highland area of Scotland, extending from Inverness to Thurso and Wick. As the name suggests, it is the northernmost railway in the United Kingdom. The line is entirely single-track, with only passing loops at some intermediate stations allowing trains to pass each other. In common with other railway lines in the Highlands and northern Lowlands, it is not electrified and all trains are diesel-powered.

Route
The line links the city of Inverness, the largest city in the Scottish Highlands, with the towns of Wick and Thurso at the northeastern tip of Britain.

Like the A9 trunk road north of Inverness, the Far North Line broadly follows the east-facing coastline of the Moray Firth, with all three termini located on the coast. As such, the railway links many of the same places as the road.

Many more places were served by both the railway and the road before three new road bridges were built: across the Beauly Firth (between Inverness and the Black Isle), the Cromarty Firth and the Dornoch Firth. As a result, at some locations railway is now a long way inland from the modern route of the A9.

The railway also loops a long way inland between Tain and Golspie, running via Lairg, which has never been on the A9; it was envisaged at the time of construction that this diversion would open the centre of Sutherland to trade. It also takes a large inland detour north of Helmsdale, running via the Flow Country, which the A9 also never passed through; this diversion was dictated by the unfavourable terrain of the Caithness coastline.

Inverness–Tain: through Ross-shire

The railway line begins at Inverness station, where passenger connections are available for the Highland Main Line (to Perth, Glasgow, Edinburgh and London) and the Aberdeen–Inverness line (to Inverness Airport, Elgin and Aberdeen), as well as for bus services to destinations throughout the Scottish Highlands. While the A9 leaves Inverness by crossing the Beauly Firth on the Kessock Bridge, the Far North Line instead heads west and runs alongside the Firth.

The single track crosses both the River Ness and the Caledonian Canal before it leaves Inverness and parallels the A862 road towards the village of Beauly. After , the line crosses the River Beauly and then takes a sharp, almost 180° right turn (from a west-southwest heading to north-northeast); Beauly station is located halfway along this curve. Closed in 1960, the station reopened in 2002 and its single operational platform has the distinction of being the shortest on the National Rail network, at just .

The line then carries on north, crossing the historic county border from Inverness-shire into Ross and Cromarty just before reaching Muir of Ord station, which has two platforms and is the site of the first passing loop on the line. The line continues to parallel the A862 as it passes through Conon Bridge station, which reopened in 2013 in a similar style to Beauly and whose platform is just  longer than that at Beauly. Shortly after, the line crosses the River Conon and passes through the village of Maryburgh before reaching Dingwall station – the busiest station on the line aside from Inverness, with just over 80 thousand passengers recorded in the 2019–20 financial year.

The Far North Line, meanwhile, rejoins the coast and continues northeast along the shoreline of the Cromarty Firth; the railway meets the A9 again shortly after, at the north end of the Cromarty Bridge.

After Alness the line turns gently eastwards to reach Invergordon station before turning northeast again. The line continues in this direction for nearly  without another station until . The railway then takes a sharp turn to run northwest for approximately  until it reaches Tain station on the south side of the Dornoch Firth.

Tain–Helmsdale: Lairg loop and the Sutherland coast
A short distance west of Tain, the Far North Line and the A9 part ways again – while the road crosses the Dornoch Firth by means of a  bridge, the railway line instead follows the coast of the Firth. In fact, the railway does not return to an open coastline for another  until Golspie, even though the distance between Tain and Golspie as the crow flies is only . There have been many unsuccessful proposals to build a new, shorter railway line between the two villages via Dornoch, which led to the existing route via Lairg being sometimes unofficially called the "Lairg loop".

Soon after the A9 splits away, the line crosses the lieutenancy area boundary from Ross and Cromarty into Sutherland. The track follows the route of the A836 until the next station on the line, at the end of the Dornoch Firth. The station is in the village of Ardgay and also serves the slightly larger village of Bonar Bridge on the opposite side of the Kyle of Sutherland.

At just , the distance between these two stations is among the shortest in all of Britain. There is no direct road connection between the two sides of the Kyle at this location, and a public footpath was only built alongside the viaduct in 2000; prior to this, the railway was the only way to travel between the two stations without taking a  detour via Bonar Bridge. The Kyle once also marked the border between the historic counties of Ross and Cromarty and Sutherland; however, the modern boundary between the respective lieutenancy areas lies several miles to the south, putting both stations in modern-day Sutherland.

This is the furthest point away from the coast on the Lairg loop; beyond the station the line curves sharply eastwards and heads back towards the Moray Firth along Strath Fleet, now paralleling the A839 road. Immediately east of the station there is an open level crossing – one of only two on the line.  after Rogart, the railway meets the A9 again, as it passes by Mound Alderwoods and Loch Fleet. This was once the site of The Mound station and a junction with the Dornoch Light Railway to Dornoch; both the station and the branch closed in 1960. The railway then turns northeast and returns to the coast at Golspie, with the station located at the western end of the village.

Just east of Golspie, the line meets Dunrobin Castle station, which was built as a private, single-platform halt for the Duke of Sutherland to serve Dunrobin Castle a short distance south of the track. The station closed in 1965 but reopened in 1985; today, the station is a public request stop, although it is only open during the summer months (one of only two such stations on the National Rail network, alongside  elsewhere in Scotland), corresponding to the castle's annual opening times. The station is also notable for its lack of lighting; as such, no trains are scheduled to call at the platform before 9am or after about 6pm.

The line continues along the coast for another , occasionally coming just metres away from the shoreline, passing through Brora station before reaching the village of Helmsdale, located at the mouth of the river of the same name. Helmsdale station lies on the other side of the river from most of the village.

Helmsdale–Wick/Thurso: Strath of Kildonan and Caithness

Beyond Helmsdale, the railway is forced to divert away from the Moray Firth coast and from the A9 once again, avoiding the unfavourable terrain of the Ord of Caithness. Instead, the line takes a sharp turn northwest and heads inland towards the Flow Country – the largest expanse of blanket bog in Europe. This is by far the most remote section of the entire line: the majority of the intermediate stations along this stretch are request stops, and each station only serves a handful of isolated houses.

Initially, the single track follows the course of the Strath of Kildonan together with the A897. Kildonan station, one of the least-used stations on the line, lies approximately halfway along the Strath; the second open level crossing on the line is just to the southeast of the station. The far end of the Strath, close to the point where the A897 meets the B871 road, marks the location of Kinbrace station. 

Beyond Kinbrace, in stark contrast to the rest of the line (and most of the Scottish Highlands), the topography of the surrounding area becomes flat and low-lying, and will remain so until the railway's terminus. The line carries on northwards alongside the A897 for  until it reaches Forsinard station which, despite its isolation, is not a request stop. With two platforms, this station is the last place on the line where passenger trains running in opposite directions can pass each other. The station serves the Forsinard Flows National Nature Reserve, among other nearby parts of the Flow Country; an RSPB visitor centre is adjacent to the station platforms. Soon, the line leaves the county of Sutherland and enters Caithness.

As the track passes through Caithness countryside, it eventually reaches Altnabreac station. There are, however, a handful of houses in the immediate vicinity of the station, accessed by a private dirt road, which is marked as a public cycle trail on Ordnance Survey maps.

The line then turns gently to the northeast, passing by several small lochs en route, before passing under the B870 road (the first public road in proximity of the line since Forsinard). This is the site of Scotscalder station, which is among the least-used stations on the line, typically averaging less than 1 passenger per day. The line reaches its penultimate station, at the point where the line crosses the A9 again. Adjoining the station on the south side is a freight terminal built in 2012 by Direct Rail Services; this was used by trains taking nuclear material from Dounreay to Sellafield.

At Georgemas Junction, which is not a request stop, the lines to Thurso and Wick diverge; this is the northernmost railway junction in the United Kingdom. The Wick-facing Thurso branch curves north immediately west of the station and runs alongside the River Thurso, paralleling the A9 until it reaches Thurso station – the northernmost railway station in Britain, by the northern coast of Scotland. Thurso is the nearest station to the ferry terminal at Scrabster, which has ferry services to and from the town of Stromness in the Orkney Islands. Meanwhile, the main line to Wick continues in an east-southeasterly direction, sandwiched between the A882 and B874 roads, and terminates at Wick station on the east coast. At , the distance between Georgemas Junction and Wick is the longest between any two adjacent stations on the line, although three other stations existed along this stretch until 1960.

Infrastructure
The whole line is unelectrified. Despite its considerable length and passing through the mostly mountainous Scottish Highlands, there are no tunnels on the line.

The loops at Rogart and Brora are not timetabled to be the passing place for any scheduled passenger services, but they can be used as such during major disruption on the line.

History

Pre-Nationalisation 
The line was built in several stages:
Inverness and Ross-shire Railway - Opened 11 June 1862 between Inverness and Ardgay
Sutherland Railway - Opened 13 April 1868 between Ardgay and Golspie
Duke of Sutherland's Railway - Opened 1 November 1870 between Golspie and Helmsdale
Sutherland and Caithness Railway - Opened 28 July 1874 between Helmsdale and Wick / Thurso

Much of the work was done by the Inverness-based Highland Railway company or, when completed, taken over by that company. In 1923 the Highland Railway was grouped into the London, Midland and Scottish Railway, under the Railways Act of 1921.

Like railway lines generally in Britain, the line was not a product of any strategic plan, but was an ad hoc development, facilitated by Private Acts of Parliament (which were themselves a significant expense for developers) and dependent on cooperation between companies and individuals, each with their own private vested interests. The line became strategically important during World War I and World War II as part of a supply route for Scapa Flow, Orkney.

That the line extends beyond Ardgay in the county of Ross and Cromarty is due, to a large extent, to the railway enthusiasm (some might say madness) of the 3rd Duke of Sutherland. The duke realised his dream of running his own private train to and from his own station at Dunrobin Castle.

The duke's enthusiasm took the line as far as Gartymore, a little south of Helmsdale, in the county of Sutherland, but this development was more of a financial liability than an asset: the long-term viability of the line then depended on a Caithness willingness, not least from the 17th Earl of Caithness, to link the line to the population centres of Wick and Thurso.

North of Helmsdale the line was built by the Sutherland and Caithness Railway. Turning inland, it reaches Forsinard in the Flow Country. The building of the line through the Flow Country – one of the most scarcely populated parts of Scotland – was to avoid the Berriedale Braes. North of Helmsdale as far as Lybster, it would have been impractical to build a railway without massive civil engineering projects. Thus coastal villages such as Latheron and Lybster are not served by the line.

In 1902, under the provisions of the Light Railways Act 1896, the standard gauge Wick and Lybster Railway was built along the east coast of Caithness, running south from Wick to Lybster. This line was never profitable, and it closed in 1944.

Historic branch lines also served Dornoch and the Black Isle.

1989–90 flooding 
On 7 February 1989, Ness Viaduct, just west of Inverness station, collapsed in unprecedented flooding. The remaining  of network to Kyle of Lochalsh and The Far North line had to be operated from a temporary maintenance site at Muir of Ord. A new viaduct was opened in time for the 1990 summer season on 14 May 1990.

"Press & Ride" request stops
On , Scotscalder station became the trial site for a new "Press & Ride" request stop system on the Far North Line developed by Transport Scotland.

Under the traditional system, passengers wishing to board the train at a request stop had to flag the train by raising their arm; this meant that the driver needed to reduce the train's speed before a request stop (to look out for any potential passengers on the platform and be able to stop if necessary), even if the platform was empty. The new system envisaged the installation of an automatic kiosk (with a button for passengers to press) at each request stop. This alerts the driver about any waiting passengers in advance; if there is no requirement to stop, the train can maintain line speed through the station, thus improving reliability on the whole line.

Services

Current passenger services

All passenger trains are operated by ScotRail using Class 158/7 "Express Sprinter" diesel multiple units. The exact stopping pattern varies between each station, as not all trains run the full length of the Far North Line.

The service pattern is infrequent and very irregular, with intervals between consecutive trains at Inverness varying from just 15 minutes to as long as two-and-a-half hours. As of 2022, on weekdays (including Saturdays), there are 14 trains per day (tpd) arriving at Inverness from the north, and 12 northbound departures:
 1 tpd each way shuttling to and from  only;
 4 tpd running the full length to and from  via .

On Sundays the services are even less frequent, with just 1 tpd (2 in the summer) to/from Kyle of Lochalsh, 1 tpd to/from Invergordon, 3 tpd to/from Tain, and just a single train each way running all the way to/from Wick.

With the exception of some Wick services, all trains are timetabled to stop at every intermediate station. Dunrobin Castle station is only open during the summer months; no services call there in the winter.

If there are no passengers wishing to get on or off the train, it will pass through without stopping.

Since 2000, trains to and from Wick have run via Thurso. On arrival at Georgemas Junction from Inverness, trains reverse to serve Thurso, then reverse again from Thurso to run back to Georgemas Junction (stopping there for a second time) and continue on to Wick. This procedure is mirrored for Inverness-bound services.

Services between Inverness and Wick typically have a journey time of about 4 hours 20 minutes end-to-end.

Freight 
 has been used for freight handling and had a new railhead opened in 2012 for the transportation of nuclear flasks, but the terminal has not attracted any commercial operators since. In 2020, a trial project funded by a £195,000 grant from the Scottish Government saw timber transported from Georgemas Junction to a processing facility near Inverness by Victa Railfreight.

Previous services

1923–1948 (London Midland and Scottish Railway)
The London, Midland and Scottish Railway introduced two titled trains in 1936, the Orcadian and John O'Groat.

1948–1997 (British Rail Scottish Region)

In 1963, the line was listed for closure on the Beeching Report; however, the Far North Line remained open due to pressure from protesters.

Following the elimination of steam traction by the early 1960s, trains on the line were normally hauled by Inverness allocated Class 24 diesel locomotives (D5114-32), then subsequently by Class 26 diesel locomotives. In the 1980s these were replaced by more powerful Class 37 locomotives, still with Mark 1 rolling stock. These were replaced by Class 156s in the 1990s by British Rail, then by Class 158 units (branded as Express Sprinters).  Three trains each way per day (Mon-Sat) was the standard service pattern at this time.

1997–2004 (ScotRail)

The service provided by ScotRail replicated that provided in the latter years of BR Scottish Region. ScotRail was owned by ScotRail (National Express) until 17 October 2004 when First ScotRail took over the franchise.

This practice ended when s were introduced on the line, adopting the current calling pattern.

2005–2015 (First ScotRail)
Along the full length of the line there were four services each way Monday to Saturday, including a service allowing a connection from the Orkney ferry, and one service each way on Sundays. In the Winter 2008/9 timetable the number of trains to and from Wick was increased to four each way on Mondays to Saturdays.

Passenger volumes

The statistics cover twelve-month periods that start in April.

Future

Electrification
In the Scottish Government's National Transport Strategy, published in February 2020, it was stated that the section between Inverness and Tain would be electrified with overhead lines by 2035; an alternative to diesel traction - ostensibly hydrogen - would be used for the remainder of the route.

Delmore Loop 
There are plans to construct a new passing loop between Inverness and Beauly.

Proposals

Lairg loop bypass
For many years there have been proposals to bypass the Lairg loop with a line across the Dornoch Firth, linking Tain more directly with Golspie via Dornoch. British Rail attempted to get funding for this when the road bridge was built, but the government declined. On 6 March 1987 the government confirmed that it would not fund the project.

This project would involve building a new bridge over the Dornoch Firth, or making the existing A9 road bridge dual-purpose. Discussions have been held concerning the shortening of the Far North Line involving a bridge over the Firth and the possible use of the trackbed of the former light railway; however, there have been no confirmed plans for such a shortcut to date.

New stations
The Friends of the Far North Line campaign group, meanwhile, proposes the reopening of Halkirk station near Georgemas Junction; it also looks into the possibility of constructing a new curve of track at Georgemas so that trains could serve the Thurso branch directly, without having to reverse at Georgemas Junction station.

Notes

References

External links 

Friends of the Far North Line
 
 

Transport in Highland (council area)
Transport in Inverness
Railway lines in Scotland
Railway lines opened in 1874
Standard gauge railways in Scotland